League Park refers to two former American football and baseball stadiums located in Akron, Ohio. The original League Park was located at the corner of Carroll St. and Beaver St.; the newer stadium was on Lakeshore Blvd. between W. Long St. and W. Crosier St.

Tenants 

The stadiums were home to the Akron Pros of the National Football League from 1920 to 1922.  In 1933, the Akron Black Tyrites, a Negro league baseball team, played their home games here. It also hosted the Akron Yankees of the Middle Atlantic League, as well as various other minor league baseball team in Akron.

Capacity 

The later stadium had a capacity of 5,000 spectators.

Characteristics 

The second League Park was built on land that had a sharp drop-off directly behind the left field fence.  This led to the left field wall slanting backwards at such an angle that outfielders could easily run up the wall, using it as a ramp, and catch fly balls that would have otherwise left the park.  Since balls hit to left could literally roll up and over the fence, a rule was necessary declaring such hits a ground-rule double.

References

External links
 Stadium information

Akron Zips football
American football venues in Ohio
Baseball venues in Ohio
Defunct minor league baseball venues
Defunct college football venues
Defunct National Football League venues
Defunct baseball venues in the United States
Demolished sports venues in Ohio
Akron Pros
Negro league baseball venues
Ohio League venues
Defunct sports venues in Ohio
Sports venues in Akron, Ohio
Sports venues completed in 1906
1906 establishments in Ohio